The 2014 NBA draft was held on June 26, 2014, at the Barclays Center, Brooklyn National Basketball Association (NBA) teams took turns selecting amateur U.S. college basketball players and other eligible players, including international players. The draft lottery took place on May 7, 2014. The Cleveland Cavaliers won the draft lottery to earn the first overall pick in the draft; this is the fourth number-one pick for Cleveland since 2003 and third number-one pick over a four-year span from 2011 to 2014. This draft would also be the first for the reborn Charlotte Hornets, who played as the Bobcats from 2004 to 2014, since 2001, when the original Charlotte Hornets last selected as the Charlotte Hornets before moving to New Orleans and eventually becoming the current New Orleans Pelicans.

Television rights in the United States belonged to ESPN. It was tipped by many to be one of the deepest and most hyped draft classes in recent years, with several players touted as future stars. State Farm was the presenting sponsor of the draft. College underclassmen that were highly touted by NBA scouts and executives included: Andrew Wiggins, Jabari Parker, Joel Embiid, Aaron Gordon, Julius Randle, Zach LaVine, T. J. Warren, and Gary Harris. Other highly sought after talents included Australian player Dante Exum and Croatian player Dario Šarić, who both declared for the draft, and Doug McDermott, who was automatically eligible as a graduating college senior.

Highlights from the draft included the first selections made by Adam Silver as commissioner and Mark Tatum as deputy commissioner, the second Canadian to be the first overall pick (Andrew Wiggins), the first pair of Canadian top 10 picks and second pair of Canadian lottery picks (Wiggins and Nik Stauskas), three top 20 Canadian selections (Wiggins, Stauskas, and Tyler Ennis), the first NBA Development League player to be selected in the first round (P. J. Hairston), the first time multiple NBA Development League players were selected in the same draft (Hairston and Thanasis Antetokounmpo), and the first Cape Verdean player to be selected in the draft (Walter Tavares). In addition, a standing ovation for Isaiah Austin occurred between the 15th and 16th picks of the draft, which included having the NBA itself hold a ceremonial pick to select him as a means of letting his dream of having his name be heard in the NBA draft come true, which happened days after he was diagnosed with Marfan syndrome and originally was never considered to play professional basketball again. Nearly two months after the draft ended, Andrew Wiggins was traded to the Minnesota Timberwolves as part of a three-team deal that brought Kevin Love to Cleveland; this resulted in the second time since the NBA–ABA merger that a first overall draft pick would not play a single game for the team that drafted him (the first time being the Orlando Magic drafted Chris Webber first overall in 1993 and then minutes later, traded Webber to the Golden State Warriors for Golden State's third overall pick in the 1993 Draft, Penny Hardaway plus three of Golden State's future first-round draft selections).

Two-time MVP Nikola Jokić was taken with the 41st pick in the Second Round of the draft, making him the lowest draft selection ever to win the MVP Award.

Draft selections

Notable undrafted players

These eligible players were not selected in the 2014 NBA draft but have played at least one game in the NBA. In April 2015, the undrafted Sim Bhullar became the first player of Indian descent to play in the league.

Eligibility and entrants

The draft is conducted under the eligibility rules established in the league's new 2011 collective bargaining agreement (CBA) with its players union. The CBA that ended the 2011 lockout instituted no immediate changes to the draft, but called for a committee of owners and players to discuss future changes. , the basic eligibility rules for the draft are listed below.
 All drafted players must be at least 19 years old during the calendar year of the draft. In terms of dates, players eligible for the 2014 draft must be born on or before December 31, 1995.
 Any player who is not an "international player", as defined in the CBA, must be at least one year removed from the graduation of his high school class. The CBA defines "international players" as players who permanently resided outside the United States for three years prior to the draft, did not complete high school in the U.S., and have never enrolled at a U.S. college or university.

Early entrants
Player who are not automatically eligible must declare their eligibility for the draft by notifying the NBA offices in writing no later than 60 days before the draft. For the 2014 draft, this date fell on April 27. After this date, "early entry" players may attend NBA pre-draft camps and individual team workouts to show off their skills and obtain feedback regarding their draft positions. Under the CBA, a player may withdraw his name from consideration from the draft at any time before the final declaration date, which is 10 days before the draft. Under then-current NCAA rules, players only had until April 16 to withdraw from the draft and maintain their college eligibility.

A player who has hired an agent will forfeit his remaining college eligibility, regardless of whether he is drafted. Also, while the CBA allows a player to withdraw from the draft twice, the NCAA then mandated that a player who declared twice lost his college eligibility.

This year, a total of 45 collegiate players and 30 international players declared as early entry candidates. On June 16, the withdrawal deadline, 18 early entry candidates withdrew from the draft, leaving 44 collegiate players and 13 international players as the early entry candidates for the draft.

Automatically eligible entrants
Players who do not meet the criteria for "international" players are automatically eligible if they meet any of the following criteria:
 They have completed 4 years of their college eligibility.
 If they graduated from high school in the U.S., but did not enroll in a U.S. college or university, four years have passed since their high school class graduated.
 They have signed a contract with a professional basketball team outside of the NBA, anywhere in the world, and have played under that contract.

Players who meet the criteria for "international" players are automatically eligible if they meet any of the following criteria:
 They are least 22 years old during the calendar year of the draft. In terms of dates, players born on or before December 31, 1992, are automatically eligible for the 2014 draft.
 They have signed a contract with a professional basketball team outside of the NBA within the United States, and have played under that contract.

Before the draft, the NBA released a list of D-League players who are automatically eligible for the draft.

Combine

The invitation-only NBA Draft Combine occurred in Chicago from May 14 to 18. 60 players were invited. The 2014 D-League Elite Mini Camp, which included 37 players, occurred in Chicago in the two days preceding the combine.

Draft lottery

The first 14 picks in the draft belong to teams that had missed the playoffs; the order was determined through a lottery. The lottery determined the three teams that would obtain the first three picks on the draft. The remaining first-round picks and the second-round picks were assigned to teams in reverse order of their win–loss record in the previous season. As it is commonplace in the event of identical win–loss records, the NBA performed a random drawing to break the ties on April 18, 2014.

The lottery was held on May 20, 2014, at the Times Square Studios in New York City. The Cleveland Cavaliers, who had the ninth-worst record, won the lottery with just a 1.7% chance to win the first pick. It was the second year in a row the Cavaliers won the lottery, as well as their third time in four years. It also tied the Chicago Bulls ascension in the 2008 NBA draft for the second largest upset ever and the largest upset in the current lottery system that started in 1994. The Milwaukee Bucks, who had the worst record and the highest chance to win the lottery at 25%, obtained the second pick. The lottery completed with the Philadelphia 76ers, who had the second-worst record, obtaining the third pick.

Below were the chances for each team to get specific picks in the draft lottery, rounded to three decimal places:

Draft ceremony
In the first round of the draft, each team has five minutes to decide which player they would like to select. During the five minutes, the team can also propose a trade with another team before making their final selection. The NBA commissioner then announce the selection and the player, wearing a basketball cap sporting the team's logo, comes up to the stage to be congratulated and presented to the audience. In the second round, each team has two minutes to make their picks while the deputy commissioner assumes the commissioner's role.

The NBA annually invites around 10–15 players to sit in the so-called "green room", a special room set aside at the draft site for the invited players to sit with their families and agents. When their names are called, the player leaves the room and goes up on stage. Other players who are not invited, are allowed to attend the ceremony, sit in the stands with the fans and walk up on stage when they're drafted. This year, however, the league decided to invite 21 players to the green room. The 20 players who were invited and attended the draft are Tyler Ennis, Dante Exum, Aaron Gordon, Gary Harris, Rodney Hood, Zach LaVine, Doug McDermott, Shabazz Napier, Jusuf Nurkić, Jabari Parker, Adreian Payne, Elfrid Payton, Julius Randle, Dario Šarić, Marcus Smart, Nik Stauskas, Noah Vonleh, T. J. Warren, Andrew Wiggins and James Young. Joel Embiid was invited, but he was unable to attend the draft due to an injury sustained before the draft and its subsequent surgery that prevented him from traveling to New York. Out of the 21 players invited, 19 players were selected in the top 19. The other two, Hood and Napier, were selected 23rd and 24th respectively.

In addition to the above, former Baylor player Isaiah Austin, who had declared for the draft but was forced to end his playing career after being diagnosed with Marfan syndrome during a physical for the draft, was invited to attend as a special guest of commissioner Adam Silver. During the draft, he was ceremonially drafted by the league between the 15th and the 16th picks and came up to the stage sporting a generic NBA cap.

Trades involving draft picks

Pre-draft trades
Prior to the day of the draft, the following trades were made and resulted in exchanges of draft picks between the teams.

Draft-day trades
The following trades involving drafted players were made on the day of the draft.

Notes

See also
 List of first overall NBA draft picks

References
General

Specific

External links
Official Site

Draft
National Basketball Association draft
NBA draft
NBA draft
2010s in Brooklyn
Basketball in New York City
Sporting events in New York City
Sports in Brooklyn
Events in Brooklyn, New York